Prvoslav Mihajlović (13 April 1921 – 28 June 1978) was a Serbian-Yugoslav footballer and head coach.

Biography
On the national level he played for Yugoslavia national team (13 matches/6 goals) and was a participant at the 1948 Olympic Games, where his team won a silver medal, and at the 1950 FIFA World Cup. With Partizan he won 2 national championships (1947, 1949) and 4 Yugoslav cups (1947, 1952, 1954, 1957). During 1951. Mihajlović played 10 friendly matches on loan for Red Star in two months and after that he came back to Partizan.

Mihajlović later worked as a football manager and coached several teams, including OFK Beograd and Yugoslavia national team, which he led at the 1962 FIFA World Cup. He also worked as assistant coach in Partizan (1959–1963) and won 3 national championships (1961, 1962, 1963).

He was the secretary and technical director of FK Partizan (1959–1963), then worked in Alexandria, Egypt (1963–1966) and Karşıyaka, Turkey (1966) and Münster, West Germany (1966–1967). He also worked in Kuwait.

References

External links
 
 
 
  Prvoslav Mihajlović at Mackolik.com 
 

Yugoslavia international footballers
Olympic footballers of Yugoslavia
Olympic silver medalists for Yugoslavia
Yugoslav footballers
Serbian footballers
Yugoslav football managers
Yugoslav expatriate football managers
Serbian football managers
Footballers at the 1948 Summer Olympics
1950 FIFA World Cup players
1962 FIFA World Cup managers
FK Obilić players
OFK Beograd players
FK Partizan players
Red Star Belgrade footballers
Yugoslav First League players
Association football midfielders
Yugoslav expatriate sportspeople in Egypt
Expatriate football managers in Egypt
Sportspeople from Valjevo
1921 births
1978 deaths
Olympic medalists in football
Karşıyaka S.K. managers
SC Preußen Münster managers
Medalists at the 1948 Summer Olympics